Peter Capell (3 September 1912 – 3 March 1986) was a German actor who was active on screen from 1945 until 1985. Apart from a lengthy film career, he appeared in many television series and mini-series. He appeared in many old time radio programs including the series Dimension X.

His first role was in Winterset, shortly after the end of the Second World War. His final role came a year before his death, when he appeared in Mamas Geburtstag. Both of these were television productions. He also appeared in many films, including Willy Wonka & the Chocolate Factory (1971). Capell was also in Stanley Kubrick's 1957 war film Paths of Glory (he also narrated the film's opening sequence), co-starring Kirk Douglas.

Death 
Capell died in Munich, West Germany on March 3, 1986, aged 73. No cause of death was announced.

Selected filmography

 Walk East on Beacon (1952) - Chris Zalenko / Gino
  (1955) - Robert Fleming
 The Story of Anastasia (1956)
 My Father, the Actor (1956)
 The Trapp Family (1956) - Ellis Island Officer
 Between Time and Eternity (1956) - Police Inspector
 Königin Luise (1957)
 The Night of the Storm (1957) - Dr. Baumgarten
 The Burglar (1957) - Baylock
  (1957) - Jim Tompson Capitain
 Paths of Glory (1957) - Narrator of Opening Sequence / Chief Judge of Court-Martial
 Nasser Asphalt (1958) - Donnagan
 The Vikings (1958) - Minor Role (uncredited)
 A Gift for Heidi (1958) - Doc.
 Taiga (1958)
  (1959)
 For the First Time (1959) - Leopold Hübner
  (1960) - Geck
 I Aim at the Stars (1960) - Dr. Neumann
 The Big Show (1961) - Pietro Vizzini
 Armored Command (1961) - Little General
 One, Two, Three (1961) - Mishkin
 Auf Wiedersehen (1961) - Louis Holloway
 The Counterfeit Traitor (1962) - Unger (uncredited)
 Der Prozeß Carl von O. (TV film, 1964) - Dritter Mitarbeiter der 'Weltbühne'
 I Deal in Danger (1966) - Eckhardt
 Glorious Times at the Spessart Inn (1966) - Bürgermeister
 Die goldene Pille (1968) - Priest
 Assignment K (1968) - Chalet Landlord (uncredited)
  (1970) - Vanetti
 Wie kurz ist die Zeit zu lieben (1970) - Pater 
 Siegfried und das sagenhafte Liebesleben der Nibelungen (1971) - Priest (uncredited)
 Willy Wonka & the Chocolate Factory (1971) - The Tinker
  (1971) - Arzt Dr. M. Weingärtner
 Hausfrauen-Report (1971) - Arzt
 Lover of the Great Bear (1971)
 Hausfrauen-Report 3.Teil (1971) - Lawyer
 Escape to the Sun (1972) - Prof. Abramowiz
 Junge Mädchen mögen's heiß, Hausfrauen noch heißer (1973)
 Wachtmeister Rahn (1974)
 Tod eines Fremden (1976) - Mahmoud
 Sorcerer (1977) - Lartigue
 Fedora (1978) - Second Director
 Son of Hitler (1978) - Fritz Buchmann
 The American Success Company (1980) - Lichtenstein
 Charlotte (1981) - Grandfather
 The Little Drummer Girl (1984) - Schwili

Television
 Blue Light (1966) - Prof. Felix Eckhardt
 Alexander Zwo (1972) - Friedberg's solicitor
 Derrick - (1975-1984) - Drogenboß mit Schäferhund / Häftling / Dr. Bonsmann
  (1982) - Abbé Blanes

References

External links
 
 

1912 births
1986 deaths
German male film actors
German male television actors
Male actors from Berlin
20th-century German male actors